Penicillium discolor is a species of the genus of Penicillium which occurs in nuts, vegetables and cheese and produces chaetoglobosins (chaetoglobosin A - J), palitantin, cyclopenin, cyclopenol, cyclopeptin, dehydrocyclopeptin, viridicatin and viridicatol.

See also
 List of Penicillium species

References 

discolor
Fungi described in 1997